Russia–South Korea relations
 Russia–North Korea relations